Ferrimonadaceae is a family in the order of Alteromonadales.

References

Further reading 
 

Alteromonadales